Spéranza Calo-Séailles or Elpís Kalogeropoúlou in Greek; Ελπίς Καλογεροπούλου (17 May 1885 – 18 February 1949) was a Greek painter, inventor and opera singer. She is known as a singer and artist, but she invented a type of decorative concrete which went under the name Lap.

Life

Calo-Séailles was born in Constantinople in 1885 where her name was Elpís Kalogeropoúlou. She first attracted attention as a mezzo-soprano and she acquired a patron who was willing to support her development.

In 1923 she invented a type of decorative concrete and a patent was applied for in June 1923. The new material which went under the name Lap. Her invention was developed by her and her husband who was a Sorbonne Professor.

They provided a challenge when the building was renovated in 2012 and the panels were replaced with GR.

In 1930 she was creating work using Lap with Tsuguharu Foujita. Foujita made her portrait and also created several works in Lap at the company's base in Antony.

Calo-Séailles died in Paris in 1949.

References

Greek women painters
1885 births
1949 deaths
Constantinopolitan Greeks
20th-century Greek painters
20th-century Greek women opera singers
Greek mezzo-sopranos
Operatic mezzo-sopranos
20th-century Greek women artists
Greek inventors
Women inventors
20th-century inventors
Singers from Istanbul
Artists from Istanbul
Emigrants from the Ottoman Empire to Greece